Maurice Evans  (born 1859) was a Welsh international footballer. He was part of the Wales national football team, playing 1 match on 17 March 1884 against England. At club level, he played for Oswestry Town.

See also
 List of Wales international footballers (alphabetical)

References

External links
 
 

1859 births
Place of birth missing
Date of death missing
Year of death missing
Welsh footballers
Wales international footballers
Oswestry Town F.C. players
Association football defenders